Abdul Rahman Haji Ahmadi, (born, 1941, Iran) commonly known as just Haji Ahmadi, is an Iranian Kurdish leader. He leads a group called the Kurdistan Free Life Party (PJAK), a group fighting against the Iranian government for the creation of an autonomous Kurdish region inside Iran. He is said to live in exile with German citizenship in Cologne, Germany, where he allegedly leads the organization. The PJAK is designated as a terrorist organization by the United States, Iran, and Turkey, while Russia, the United Nations (UN), the European Union (EU), and many other countries refuse to designate it as a terrorist organization.

In summer 2007, he visited Washington, although according to the United States government he did not meet with any officials.

In March 2010, Haji Ahmadi was arrested at his residence in Germany by German authorities, but was released shortly afterwards. The German government gave no details regarding why he was arrested or released. Before his release, the Iranian government had asked Germany to extradite Haji Ahmadi to Iran. However, Germany refused this request on the grounds that Haji Ahmadi is a German citizen. In response, Iran's Foreign Ministry spokesman Ramin Mehmanparast told a news conference in Tehran that the decision to free Haji Ahmadi amounted to "practically supporting terrorism", and that "Europe has become a haven for terrorists."

References

External links
PJAK Homepage

Iranian Kurdish people
Kurdistan Free Life Party politicians
Fugitives wanted on terrorism charges
Iranian Kurdish politicians
Living people
Iran–PJAK conflict
Kurdish nationalists
German people of Kurdish descent
Iranian emigrants to Germany
Fugitives wanted by Iran
1941 births